The P2000 is an articulated light rail car used on the Los Angeles County Metro Rail system. It was manufactured by Siemens Mobility and is used on Metro's A and C lines. It was previously used on the L Line between 2003 and 2012.

The trains feature automatic train control, automatic train operation for C Line service, air conditioning, emergency intercoms, wheelchair spaces and emergency braking.

In June 2013, Metro awarded a fixed price contract to PAMCO Machine Works in Monrovia, California, to overhaul the powered axle assemblies for the then eleven year old P2000's.

Since 2020, some units have been taken out of service for refurbishment by Alstom.

See also 
 Nippon Sharyo P865
 AnsaldoBreda P2550
 Kinki Sharyo P3010

References

External links 
 

Los Angeles Metro Rail
Electric multiple units of the United States
Train-related introductions in 1996
750 V DC multiple units

Siemens multiple units
Siemens tram vehicles
Light rail vehicles
Articulated passenger trains